San Angelo State Park is a Texas state park in San Angelo, Texas in the United States. It encompasses  leased by Texas Parks and Wildlife Department from the United States Army Corps of Engineers. It opened in 1995 and is located on the shores of the O.C. Fisher Reservoir.

History 

The O.C. Fisher Reservoir was completed in 1952 by the United States Army Corps of Engineers with assistance from the Upper Colorado River Authority for the purpose of flood control and to provide secondary source of drinking water for San Angelo and the surrounding communities. The land surrounding it, which now makes up the area of the park, was leased to the Texas Parks and Wildlife Department and opened as San Angelo State Park in 1995. Native Americans, according to archeological findings, had lived in the area for 18,000 years starting with Paleo-American hunters of giant Ice Age mammals. European Americans arrived in the early 16th century establishing missions for the resident Jumano Indians.

Facilities 
Facilities at the park include six enclosed air-conditioned and heated mini-cabins and numerous  campsites with water and electricity, picnic table and grills and nearby restroom facilities. The park also has over 50 miles of developed trails suitable for hiking, mountain biking, and equestrian use along with 10 horse pens. Boat ramps are available and a fishing dock was constructed.

A small herd of American bison and part of the Official Texas State Longhorn Herd are kept at the park.

Activities 
Some of the recreational opportunities offered on the site include camping, hiking, mountain biking, horseback riding, boating, fishing and lake swimming. With a State Park Annual Hunting Permit deer and turkey hunting is permitted.

See also
List of Texas state parks

References

External links 

 Texas Parks and Wildlife Department: San Angelo State Park
 San Angelo Outdoors: San Angelo State Park
 Friends of San Angelo State Park
Home movie (c. 1973) of hang gliding in San Angelo State Park from the Jenkins Family Films from the Texas Archive of the Moving Image

1995 establishments in Texas
Protected areas established in 1995
Protected areas of Tom Green County, Texas
San Angelo, Texas
State parks of Texas